The 2001 Coca-Cola 600, the 42nd running of the event, was a NASCAR Winston Cup Series race held on May 27, 2001 at Lowe's Motor Speedway in Charlotte, North Carolina. Contested at 400 laps on the 1.5 mile (2.4 km) speedway, it was the twelfth race of the 2001 NASCAR Winston Cup Series season. Jeff Burton of Roush Racing won the race.

Background

Lowe's Motor Speedway is a motorsports complex located in Concord, North Carolina, United States 13 miles from Charlotte, North Carolina. The complex features a 1.5 miles (2.4 km) quad oval track that hosts NASCAR racing including the prestigious Coca-Cola 600 on Memorial Day weekend and The Winston, as well as the UAW-GM Quality 500. The speedway was built in 1959 by Bruton Smith and is considered the home track for NASCAR with many race teams located in the Charlotte area. The track is owned and operated by Speedway Motorsports Inc. (SMI) with Humpy Wheeler as track president.

Summary
Tony Stewart successfully performed the "Double Duty", also running the Indianapolis 500 the same day; Joe Gibbs Racing had Mike McLaughlin on standby if he did not arrive on time. After finishing sixth at Indy, Stewart arrived less than half an hour before the start of the race. If Stewart did not arrive for the start of the Coca-Cola 600, McLaughlin would have been given credit for the start under NASCAR rules. He had to start at the end of the field (43rd place) due to missing the mandatory drivers' meeting that is held two hours before any race. Stewart eventually finished this race in third. This was his second Double Duty after 1999, where he finished ninth at Indy and fourth at Charlotte.

Jeff Burton won the race driving for Roush Racing as the team became the first to win three races in a row.

Failed to qualify: John Andretti ( 43), Kyle Petty (No. 45), Derrike Cope (No. 37), Mike Wallace (No. 7), Jeff Fultz (No. 54), Carl Long (No. 85)

Top 10 results

Race statistics
 Time of race: 4:20:40
 Average Speed: 
 Pole Speed: 185.217
 Cautions: 6 for 45 laps
 Margin of Victory: 3.19 sec
 Lead changes: 28
 Percent of race run under caution: 11.2%         
 Average green flag run: 50.7 laps

References

Coca-Cola 600
Coca-Cola 600
NASCAR races at Charlotte Motor Speedway